Morzhenga is a rural locality (a village) in Nesterovskoye Rural Settlement, Sokolsky District, Vologda Oblast, Russia. The population was 137 as of 2002. There are 8 streets.

Geography 
Morzhenga is located 46 km north of Sokol (the district's administrative centre) by road. Zabolotye is the nearest rural locality.

References 

Rural localities in Sokolsky District, Vologda Oblast